William Christian van Rugge (1921-1997) was an Australian rugby league footballer who played in the 1940s.

Playing career
A Newtown junior, Bill van Rugge's career was cut short by war service in the Australian Army during World War II. In 1944 Van Rugge played for a combined-Brisbane team v's Ipswich in the Bulimba Cup before war service in New Guinea later that year. By war's end, his rugby league career was over.

Death
Van Rugge died on 5 July 1997 in Newcastle, New South Wales aged 76.

References

1921 births
1997 deaths
Newtown Jets players
Australian rugby league players
Rugby league players from Sydney
Rugby league wingers